Elections to Wiltshire County Council were held on Thursday, 12 April 1973.  The whole council of seventy-nine members was up for election, and the Conservatives came within a whisker of taking formal control.  

The Chairman of the Council since 1969, Sir Henry Langton, did not stand for re-election, and at the annual meeting later in April was succeeded by Frank Willan, who continued for the whole four years of the council's term of office.

Election result
The Conservatives, with thirty-nine seats, took effective control of the county council. Labour ended with twenty-two county councillors, most of them in and around Swindon, while Independents ended the election with twelve seats and the Liberals six. The elections were not fiercely fought everywhere, with twenty-four of the sixty-seven divisions uncontested. Most of the uncontested seats, eighteen, went to Conservatives, five to Independents, and one to a Liberal, Jack Ainslie.

|}

Results by divisions

Amesbury No. 1

Amesbury No. 2

Amesbury No. 3

Bedwyn

Box

Bradford

Bradford & Melksham No. 1

Bradford & Melksham No. 2

Bremhill

Brinkworth

Calne North

Calne South

Cannings

Chippenham Park

Chippenham Sheldon

Chippenham Town

Collingbourne

Corsham

Cricklade

Devizes No. 1 (East)

Devizes No. 2

Downton

Enford

Fisherton

Highworth No. 1

Highworth No. 2

Highworth No. 3

Highworth No. 4

Highworth No. 5

Kington

Langley

Lavington

Malmesbury

Marlborough

Melksham

Mere & Tisbury No. 1

Mere & Tisbury No. 2

New Sarum Bemerton

New Sarum Fisherton

New Sarum St Edmund

New Sarum St Mark

New Sarum St Paul

New Sarum St Thomas

Pewsey

Potterne

Preshute

Purton

Sherston

Swindon East

Swindon Kings

Swindon North

Swindon Queens

Swindon South No. 1

Swindon South No. 2

Swindon West

Trowbridge No. 1

Trowbridge No. 2

Trowbridge No. 3

Warminster

Warminster & Westbury No. 1

Warminster & Westbury No. 2

Warminster & Westbury No. 3

Westbury

Whiteparish

Wilton

Wootton Bassett

Wylye

Notes

See also
Wiltshire County Council elections

References
The Municipal Year Book and Public Services Directory (1974)

1973
1973 English local elections
20th century in Wiltshire